This is a list of the 57th Utah State Legislature Standing Committees and Appropriations Subcommittees. The 57th Utah State Legislature began on Monday, January 15, 2007.

Senate Standing Committees

Complete list of members as of January 6, 2007.

Business

Current members

Education

Current members

Government Operations & Political Subdivisions

Current members

Health and Human Services

Current members

Judiciary, Law Enforcement & Criminal Justice

Current members

Natural Resources, Agriculture and Environment

Current members

Revenue and Taxation

Current members

Transportation, Public Utilities & Technology

Current members

Retirement & Independent Entities

Current members

Workforce Services, Community & Economic Development

Current members

Senate Rules

Current members

House Standing Committees

Complete list of members as of January 6, 2007.

Business and Labor

Current members

Education

Current members

Ethics

Current members

Government Operations

Current members

Health and Human Services

Current members

Judiciary

Current members

Law Enforcement and Criminal Justice

Current members

Natural Resources, Agriculture and Environment

Current members

Political Subdivisions

Current members

Public Utilities and Technology

Current members

Retirement and Independent Entities

Current members

Revenunes and Taxation

Current members

Rules

Current members

Transportation

Current members

Workforce Services and Community and Economic Development

Current members

Joint Appropriation Subcommittees

Complete list of members as of January 6, 2007.

Capital Facilities & Administration

Current members

Commerce & Workfore Services

Current members

Economic Development & Revenue

Current members

Executive Appropriations

Current members

Executive Office & Criminal Justice

Current members

Health & Human Services

Current members

Higher Education

Current members

Natural Resources

Current members

Public Education

Current members

Retirement & Independent Entities

Current members

Transportation & Environmental Quality

Current members

Government of Utah
57th Utah State Legislature committees